The following list contains  game titles released for the Atari ST home computer systems.

0–9

'Nam 1965–1975
007: Licence to Kill
1st Math
10th Frame
12. Jahrhundert (Das)
1943: The Battle of Midway
1944
1789 la Révolution Française
1st Division Manager
20,000 Leagues Under the Sea
221B Baker Street
3-D Asteroids
3D Break-Thru
3D Construction Kit
3D Construction Kit II
3D Galax
3D Pool
3rd Reich
4 Saisons de l'ecrit (Les)
4D Sports Boxing
5 Intelligent Strategy Games
500cc Grand Prix
5th Gear
8 Ball Pool
9 Lives

A

 À La Conquête De L'Orthographe – 4e/3e
 À La Conquête De L'Orthographe – 6e/5e
 À La Conquête De L'Orthographe – CE1/CE2
 À La Conquête De L'Orthographe – CM1/CM2
A Prehistoric Tale
A.M.C.: Astro Marine Corps
A320 (Loriciel)
A320 Airbus
A320 Airbus – Edition USA (Expansion)
Aaargh!
Aazohm Krypht
ABZoo
Academy
Action Fighter
Action Service (aka Combat Course)
Addams Family, The
Addictaball
ADI 3e – Anglais
ADI 3e – Français
ADI 3e – Maths
ADI 4e – Anglais
ADI 4e – Français
ADI 4e – Maths
ADI 5e – Anglais
ADI 5e – Français
ADI 5e – Maths
ADI 6e – Anglais
ADI 6e – Français
ADI 6e – Maths
ADI CE1 – Français
ADI CE1 – Maths
ADI CE1 – Passage
ADI CE2 – Français
ADI CE2 – Maths
ADI CE2 – Passage
ADI CM1 – Français
ADI CM1 – Maths
ADI CM1 – Passage
ADI CM2 – Français
ADI CM2 – Maths
ADI CM2 – Passage
Adibac Anglais
Adibac Histoire
Adibac Maths A1/B
Adibac Maths C/E
Adibac Maths D/D
Adibou – Je Calcule 4–5 Ans
Adibou – Je Calcule 6–7 Ans
Adibou – Je Lis 4–5 Ans
Adibou – Je Lis 6–7 Ans
Adidas Championship Tie Break (aka Tie-Break)
Adrenalynn
Advanced Dungeons & Dragons: Heroes of the Lance
Advanced Destroyer Simulator
Advanced Fruit Machine Simulator
Advanced Rugby Simulator
Advanced Ski Simulator
Advantage Tennis
Adventurer
Adventures of Maddog Williams in the Dungeons of Duridian (The)
Adventures of Robin Hood (The)
Aesop's Fables
Affaire (L')
African Raiders-01
Afrika Korps
After Burner
After the War
AGE – Advanced Galactic Empire
Air Bucks
Air Supply
Air Support
Airball
Airborne Ranger
Airstrike USA (aka ATF II – Advanced Tactical Fighter II)
Albedo
Alcantor
Alcatraz
Alcon (aka Slap Fight)
ALF – The First Adventure
Aliants – The Desperate Battle for Earth
Alien Fires 2199 AD
Alien Storm
Alien Syndrome
Alien Thing – Exptert Edition
Alien World
All Aboard! Micro Gauge Train Set
All Blocked Up
Alpha Waves
Alphabet Mix
Alphabet Tutor
Alphamax
Alpine Games
Altair
Altered Beast
Alternate Reality: The City
Amazing Spider-Man (The)
Amazon
Amberstar
American Ice Hockey
American Pool II
Anarchy
Ancient Art of War in the Skies (The)
Ancient Games
Andes Attack
Angel Nieto Pole 500cc
Animal Kingdom
Annals of Rome
Annex
Another World
Answer Back Junior Quiz
Antago
Apache Flight
APB – All Points Bulletin
Apprentice
Aquanaut
Arcade Fruit Machine
Arcade Trivia Quiz
Archer Maclean's Pool (aka Pool, aka Billard Americain (Le))
Archipelagos
Arcticfox
Arena
Arkanoid
Arkanoid: Revenge of Doh
Armada
Armalyte
Armour-Geddon
Army Moves
Around the World
Art de la Guerre (L') (aka Ancient Art of War (The))
Arthur of the Britons
Artificial Dreams
Artura
Asgard
Astaroth
Astate
Asterix and the Magic Carpet (Coktel Vision video game)
Asterix in Operation Getafix
Asteroids Deluxe
At the Carnival
Atari Grand Prix
Atax
Atomic Robo-Kid
Atomino
Atomix
Aussie Joker Poker
Austerlitz
Autoduel
AV-8B Harrier Assault
Aventura Espacial (La)
Aventura Original (La)
Aventures de Carlos (Les)
Aventures de Moktar – Vol. 1, La Zoubida
Awesome
Axel's Magic Hammer

B

B-17 Flying Fortress
Baal
Baby Jo
Back to the Future Part II
Back to the Future Part III
Back to the Golden Age
Backgammon
Backgammon Royale
Backlash
Bad Cat
Bad Company
Bad Dudes Vs. Dragon Ninja 
Badlands
Badlands Pete
Baker Street Detective – Cases 1 & 2
Balade à Séville (aka Balade a Cologne)
Balade au Pays de Big Ben (aka Balade Outre Rhin)
Balance of Power
Balance of Power – The 1990 Edition
Ball Game (The)
Ball's Quest
Ballistix
Ballyhoo
Bambino fait un Puzzle
Bangkok Knights
Bank Buster
Bank-It
Barbarian (Psygnosis)
Barbarian: The Ultimate Warrior (aka Death Sword)
Barbarian II (Psygnosis)
Barbarian II: The Dungeon of Drax (aka Axe of Rage)
Bard's Tale, The
Bargon Attack
Barre l'Intrus
Basket Manager
BAT - Bureau of Astral Troubleshooters
BAT II - Bureau of Astral Troubleshooters II
Batman – The Caped Crusader
Batman – The Movie
Battle Bound
Battle Chess
Battle Command
Battle of the Atlantic – The Ocean Lifeline 1940–1944
Battle Probe
Battlehawks 1942
Battlemaster
Battleship (aka Battleships)
BattleTech: The Crescent Hawk's Inception
Battlezone
Beach Volley
Beagles About
Beam
Beast Buster
Beastlord
Belegost
Belle Zohra (La)
Bermuda Project
Betrayal
Better Dead than Alien
Beverly Hills Cop
Beyond the Ice Palace
Beyond Zork: The Coconut of Quendor
Big Business
Big Game Fishing
Big Nose The Caveman
Big Run
Bill Palmer
Billiards Simulator
Billiards Simulator II
Billy Bounce
Bimbo's Story (The)
Bio Challenge
Bionic Commando
Bismarck
Black Cauldron, The
Black Gold (Starbyte)
Black Hornet
Black Lamp
Black Orchid
Black Sect
Black Tiger
Blackjack and Solitaire
Blackjack Plus III
Blastaball
Blasteroids
Blazing Thunder
Blinky's Scary School
Blitzkrieg May 1940
Block Out
Blockbuster (aka Impact)
Blood Fever
Blood Money
Bloodwych Data Disks Volume I (Expansion)
Blue Angel 69
Blue Angels – Formation Flight Simulation
Blue Max – Aces of the Great War
Blue War (aka Blue War III)
Blueberry
Blues Brothers, The
BMX Simulator
Bob Winner
Bobo
Boggit
Bolo
Bomb Fusion
Bomb Jack
Bomb'X
Bomber Command
Bombuzal
Bonanza Bros.
Booly
Bootiful Babe
Border Warfare
Border Zone – A Game of Intrigue
Borodino
Borrowed Time
Bosse des Maths 1ere, La
Bosse des Maths 2nde, La
Bosse des Maths 3eme, La
Bosse des Maths 4eme, La
Bosse des Maths 5eme, La
Bosse des Maths 6eme, La
Boston Bomb Club
Botics
Boulder Dash Construction Kit
Bounce Out
Brain Blasters (aka The Teller)
Brainbox
Brat
Brataccas
Breach
Breach – Serayachi Campaign Disk (Expansion)
Breach II 1.0
Breach II 2.1
Breach II – Advanced Tactical Training School (Expansion)
Breach II – Campaign Disk 1 (Expansion)
Breach II Federation Collection 1 – The Azarius Incident (Expansion)
Breach II Federation Collection 2 – Azarius Under Fire (Expansion)
Breach II Federation Collection 3 – Testimony of Courage (Expansion)
Breach II Federation Collection 4 – Death Before Dishonor (Expansion)
Breach II Federation Collection 5 – Winds of Steel (Expansion)
Breach II Federation Collection 6 – Cry of War (Expansion)
Breakers
Breakout
Brian Clough's Football Fortunes (aka Brian Clough's Fussball Manager)
Brick Busta
Bride of the Robot
Brides of Dracula
Bridge
Bridge 2000
Bridge Master
Bridge Player 2000
Bridge Player 2150 Galactica
Bridge Tutor
Brilliant Boffin Brothers (The)
Brimstone – The Dream of Gawain
Bubble +
Bubble Bobble
Bubble Dizzy
Bubble Ghost
Bubble Trouble
Buffalo Bill's Rodeo Games
Bug
Bug Bash
Buggy Boy
Builderland – The Story of Melba
Bully's Sporting Darts
Bumpy's Arcade Fantasy
Bundesliga Manager
Bundesliga Manager Professional
Bunny Bricks
Bureaucracy
Burger Man
Butcher Hill
Buzzword

C

Cabal
Cadaver
Cadaver: The Pay Off (Expansion)
Caesar
California Games
California Games II
Campaign
Campaign from North Africa to Northern Europe (Expansion)
Cannon Fodder
Cap'n'Carnage
Captain America in The Doom Tube of Dr Megalomann
Captain Blood
Captain Dynamo
Captain Fizz Meets the Blaster-Trons
Captain Planet and the Planeteers
Captive
Car-Vup
Cardiac Arrest!
Cards
Cards 2.0
Carl Lewis Challenge (The)
Carrier Command
Cartographer (The)
Cartoon Capers
Casino Craps
Casino Roulette
Casque des Forgerons (Le)
Castle Master
Castle Master 2
Castle Warrior
Castles
Castors Juniors dans la Foret (Les)
Catch 23
Cave Maze
CaveMania
Centerfold Squares
Challenge (The)
Challenge Foot Junior
Challenge Golf
Chambers of Shaolin
Champion of the Raj
Championship Baseball
Championship Cricket
Championship Manager
Championship Manager 93
Championship Manager 94 (Expansion)
Championship Manager Italia
Championship Manager Italia '95 5.2i
Championship Water-Skiing (aka Dieux de la Mer (Les))
Championship Wrestling
Chaos Engine, The
Charge of the Light Brigade
Chariots of Wrath
Chase
Chase H.Q.
Chase HQ II - Special Criminal Investigation
Château du Monstre (Le)
Checkmate (Robtek)
Checkmate (Interplay) (aka Chess Champion 2175)
Chemicon
Chess Player 2150
Chess Simulator
Chessbase
Chessmaster 2000
Chez le Marchand
Chicago 30's
Chicago 90
Chichen Itza – Ci-u-than Trilogy III
Chimera
Chinese Karate
Chip's Challenge
Chopper X
Chronicles of Cyhagan, the First Tale – Disciples of Steel
Chronicles of Omega
Chrono Quest (aka Explora)
Chrono Quest II (aka Explora II)
Chubby Gristle
Chuck Rock
Chuck Yeager's Advanced Flight Trainer 2.0
Chuckie Egg
Chuckie Egg II
Circus Attractions
Circus Games
Cisco Heat
Civilization
CJ in the USA
CJ's Elephants Antics
Clan
Classic Invaders
Classiques Vol.I
Clever & Smart
Cloud Kingdoms
Clown-O-Mania
Club Backgammon
Club Dominoes
Cluedo – Master Detective
Cobra II
CoCoCoPo
Code Name: Iceman
Cohort – Fighting for Rome
Cohort II – Fighting for Rome
Colonel's Bequest, The
Colonial Conquest
Colorado
Colossus Chess X
Combo Racer
Commando
Computer Diplomacy
Computer Maniacs Diary 1989
Computer Scrabble
Computer Scrabble de Luxe
Conflict – Europe
Conflict – The Middle East Simulation
Confusion
Connaitre la France
Conqueror
Conquest of Elysium 2.0
Conquests of Camelot
Continental Circus
Cool Croc Twins
Cool World
Corona Magica (La)
Corporation
Corrupt
Corruption
Corsarios
Cortizone
Cosmic Pirate
Cosmic Relief
Cosmos
Cougar Force
Count Duckula in No Sax Please, we're Egyptian
Count Duckula II
Crack Down
Crack'ed
Crafton & Xunk
Crash Garrett
Crazy Cars
Crazy Cars II
Crazy Cars III
Crazy Shot
Creatures
Creepy
Cricket Captain 1.0
Cricket Captain 1.5
Crime City
Crime Does not Pay
Crime Time
Crime Wave
Crimson Crown
Crossbow – The Legend of William Tell
Crown
Crown of Creation 3D
Cruise for a Corpse
Crystal Castles
Crystal Kingdom Dizzy
Crystals of Arborea
Curse of Azriel
Curse of Ra (The)
Curse of the Azure Bonds
Custodian
Cutthroats
Cyber Assault
Cyberball
Cybercon III
Cybercop
Cyberdrome – Hoverjet Simulator
Cybermind – Planet of Riddle
Cybernoid
Cybernoid II – The Revenge

D

Dark Side
Days of Thunder
Deep Space
Defender of the Crown
Deflektor
Delta Patrol
Deluxe Strip Poker
Deluxe Strip Poker: Artworx' Digi-Data Disk 2 (Expansion)
Deluxe Strip Poker: Artworx' Digi-Data Disk 3 (Expansion)
Disciples of Steel
Dizzy Prince of the Yolkfolk
Dogs of War (1989 video game)
Donald Duck's Playground
Double Dragon
Double Dragon II: The Revenge
Double Dragon 3: The Rosetta Stone
Downhill Challenge
Dragonflight
Dragons of Flame
Dragons Breath
Drakkhen
Duck Dash
Dungeon Master
Dungeon Master: Chaos Strikes Back
Dynamite Düx

E

E-Motion
Elf
Eliminator
Elite
Elvira: Mistress of the Dark
Elvira II: The Jaws of Cerberus
Empire: Wargame of the Century
Encyclopedia of War: Ancient Battles
Endurance
Epic
Escape from the Planet of the Robot Monsters
Exile
Exolon

F

F-15 Strike Eagle
F-19 Stealth Fighter
F1
F29 Retaliator
F40 Pursuit Simulator
Falcon
Fantasy World Dizzy
Fate: Gates of Dawn
Fighter Bomber
Final Assault (aka Bivouac, aka Chamonix Challenge)
Final Fight
Fire and Forget
Fire and Ice
First Division Manager
Flight Simulator II
Flood
Fool's Errand, The
Football Manager
Football Manager 2
Football Manager World Cup Edition
Forgotten Worlds
Formula 1 Grand Prix
Fred
Frontier: Elite II
Fun School 2
Fun School 3
Fun School 4
Future Wars

G

Garfield: Big Fat Hairy Deal
Gauntlet
Gauntlet II
Gazza's Super Soccer (aka Anders Limpar's Proffs Fotboll, Bodo Illgner's Super Soccer)
Germ Crazy
Get Dexter II (aka L'Ange de Cristal)
Ghosts 'n Goblins
Global Commander (aka Armageddon Man (The))
Gods
Golden Axe
Golden Path, The
Gold of the Americas
Gold Rush!
Goldrunner
Grand Monster Slam
Gravon: Real Virtuality
Great Courts 2
Guild of Thieves, The

H

Hacker
Hacker II: The Doomsday Papers
Hacman
Hammerfist
Harlequin
HardBall!
Heimdall
Herman
H.E.R.O.: Human Extraction and Rescue Operation
HeroQuest
Hex
Highway Patrol 2
Hlípa
Holocaust
Hostages
Hudson Hawk
Hunter

I–K

Ikari Warriors
Impact
Incredible Shrinking Sphere
Indoor Sports
International Karate
International Karate+
International Sports Challenge
Interphase
Ishar
Ishar 2
Ishar 3
Jack Nicklaus' Greatest 18 Holes of Major Championship Golf
James Pond
Jet
Jewels of Darkness
Jimmy White's 'Whirlwind' Snooker
Joust
Judge Dredd
Just Another War in Space
Jumble Up
Jumping Jack'son
Jupiter Probe
Karateka
Karate Kid Part II: The Computer Game, The
Karting Grand Prix
Kenny Dalglish Soccer Manager
Kick Off
Kick Off 2
Killerball
King of Chicago, The
King's Quest I
King's Quest II
King's Quest III
King's Quest IV
Knightmare
Kristal, The
Kult (aka Chamber of the Sci-Mutant Priestess)

L

Lands of Havoc
Laser Chess
Laser Squad
Last Arcadian
Last Duel
Leaderboard
Leander
Leather Goddesses of Phobos
Legend of Faerghail
Legends of Valour
Leisure Suit Larry
Leisure Suit Larry 2
Leisure Suit Larry 3
Lemmings
Lemmings 2: The Tribes
Lethal Xcess
Leviathan
Life & Death
Light Corridor, The
Line of Fire
Llamatron
Lombard RAC Rally
Lost Dutchman Mine
Lotus Esprit Turbo Challenge
Lotus Turbo Challenge 2
Lotus III: The Ultimate Challenge
Lurking Horror, The

M

Macadam Bumper
Mad Professor Mariarti
Magic Boy
Magic Pockets
Magicland Dizzy
Major Motion
Manhunter: New York
Manhunter 2: San Francisco
Maniac Mansion
Marble Madness
Masterblazer
Masters of the Universe: The Movie
Maupiti Island
McDonald Land
Medieval Chess
Mega Lo Mania
Megaroids
Metal Mutant
Metro-Cross
MicroProse Golf
Microprose Soccer
MIDI Maze
Midnight Resistance
Midway Battles
Midwinter
Millennium 2.2
Mind Forever Voyaging, A
Mix and Match
Mortville Manor
Motor Massacre
Mouse Trap
Myth

N–O

Napoleon I: The Campaigns 1805-1814
NARC
Nebulus
NewZealand Story, The
Night Walk
Ninja Mission
Ninja Warriors
Nightbreed: The Arcade Game
Nightbreed: The Interactive Movie
Nitro
No Second Prize
North versus South
Obliterator
Obsession
Oh No! More Lemmings
Oids
Onslaught
Operation Stealth
Operation Wolf
Orbiter
Out Run
Overlander
Oxyd
Oxyd 2
Ozone

P–Q

Pac-Mania
Pacific Islands
Buster Bros.
Paperboy
Paradroid 90
Parasol Stars
Paris-Dakar (Zigurat)
Pawn, The
Personal Nightmare
Phantasie
Pink Panther
Player Manager
PlaySpell
Plotting
Pinball Wizard
Pipe Mania
Pirates of the Barbary Coast
Police Quest: In Pursuit of the Death Angel
Police Quest II: The Vengeance
Pop Up (aka Bumpy)
Populous
Populous II: Trials of the Olympian Gods
Power Drift
Power Up
Powermonger
Prehistoric Tale, A
Prehistorik
President Elect
Prince of Persia
Pro Boxing Simulator
Projectyle
Purple Saturn Day
Q-Ball
Quadralien
Quartet
Quartz
Question of Sport, A
Questron II

R

R-Type
Raffles
Rainbow Islands
Railroad Tycoon
Rampage
Ranarama
Raz Rats
Reaction
Real Ghostbusters, The
Red Heat
Red Lightning
Renaissance I (aka Classic 4)
Renegade
Resolution 101
Return to Genesis
Revenge of the Mutant Camels
Rick Dangerous
Rick Dangerous 2
Ripcord
Risky Woods
Road Runner
RoadBlasters
Roadwar 2000
Roadwar Europa
Roadwars
Robocod
RoboCop
RoboCop 2
Robotron: 2084
Rock 'n' Roll
Rock Star Ate My Hamster
Rocket Ranger
Rockford
Rod Land
Rogue
Rogue Trooper
Rookie
Rugby League Boss
Running Man, The
Rush

S

S.D.I
Saint Dragon
Sam 'n Ed
SAS Combat
Sargon III chess
Scooby-Doo and Scrappy-Doo
Scott Adams Adventures
Scramble Spirits
Screaming Wings
Scruples
Sea Fisherman
Sea Stalker
Seconds Out
The Secret of Monkey Island
Secrets of Steel
Sensible Soccer
Sentinel
Seven Gates of Jambala
Sex Vixens from Space
Seymour Goes to Hollywood
Shadow Sorcerer
Shadowlands
Ship Combat
Shuffleboard
Shutdown
Shoot-'Em-Up Construction Kit
Sid Meier's Pirates!
Side Arms
Siegemaster
Silent Service
SimCity
Simulcra
Sinbad and the Throne of the Falcon
Skidoo
Skrull
Skulls and Crossbones (video game)
SkyChase
Skyfighter
Skyriders
SkyStrike
Slayer
Slippery Sid
Snoopy
Sorcerer
Space Ace
Space Baller
Space Crusade
Space Gun
Space Harrier
Space Killer
Space Quest I
Space Quest II
Space Quest III
Space Pilot
Space Station
Speedball
Speedball 2
Spellbound Dizzy
Spidertronic
Spook
Spy vs. Spy
Spy vs. Spy II
Spy Snatcher
Starcross
Starflight
Starglider
Starglider 2
Starquake
Star Battle
Star Breaker
Star Fleet I: The War Begins
Star Goose
Star Raiders
Star Trash
Star Trek: The Rebel Universe
Star Wars (Domark)
Star Wars: The Empire Strikes Back (Domark)
Stationfall
Steel
Stellar Chaos
Stellar Crusade
Steve Davis World Snooker
Stonebreaker
Stormbringer
Stormtrooper
Street Fighter
Street Fighter II: The World Warrior
Strider
Strike Force Harrier
Strip Poker III
Stryx
Stunt Car Racer
ST Karate
SubStation
Summer Olympiad
SunDog: Frozen Legacy
Superstar Ice Hockey
Super Breakout
Super Cars
Super Cars II
Super Hang-On
Super Huey
Super Scramble Simulator
Super Ski
Super Sprint
Super Stuntman
Super Tennis
Super Wonderboy
Superman: The Man of Steel
Supremo Soccer
Suspect
Suspend
SWIV
Sword of Kadesh

T

Tanglewood
Techmate Chess
Teenage Mutant Ninja Turtles
Teenage Mutant Ninja Turtles II: The Arcade Game
Temple of Apshai
Terminator 2: Judgment Day
Terramex
Terrorpods
Test Drive
Tetris
ThunderCats
Thunderhawk
ThunderJaws
Time Bandit
Titan
Tom & Jerry
Toobin'
Top Gun
Total Eclipse
Tower of Babel
Tracksuit Manager
Treasure Island Dizzy
Trinity
Triple Yahtzee
Trump Castle
Turbo GT
Turrican
Turrican II: The Final Fight
Typhoon Thompson

U–V

Under Pressure
Universe 2
Ultima II
Ultima III
Ultima IV
Ultima V
Ultima VI
Venus The Flytrap
Vixen
Volfied
Voyager
Vroom
Voodoo Nightmare

W–Z

Wacky Races
Warhead
Warheli
War in Middle Earth
Waterloo
Weird Dreams
Well'Ard
Wicked
Winnie the Pooh in the Hundred Acre Wood
Winter Games
Winter Olympiad 88
Wizball
Wizkid
Wonder Boy in Monster Land
Wonderland
Xenon
Xenon 2 Megablast
X-Out
XOR
Xybots
Yogi's Great Escape
Yolanda
Zak McKracken and the Alien Mindbenders
Zarch
Zool
Zork I: The Great Underground Empire
Zork II: The Wizard of Frobozz
Zork III: The Dungeon Master
Zynaps

Games released on compilation only

Extravaganza
Haunted House
Spook.
Games Galore
Mouth Trap
Skate Tribe
Skystrike
Yomo
Golden Oldies Volume I
Adventure
Eliza
Life
Pong
Jewels of Darkness
Adventure Quest
Colossal Cave Adventure
Dungeon Adventure
Mega Sports
Summer Games
Summer Games II
Silicon Dreams
Return to Eden
Snowball
Worm in Paradise (The)
Time and Magik
Lords of Time
Price of Magik
Red Moon

See also
Lists of video games

Atari ST